Winston Lord (born August 14, 1937) is an American diplomat and leader of non-governmental foreign policy organizations. He has served as Special Assistant to the National Security Advisor (1970–1973), Director of the State Department Policy Planning Staff (1973–1977), President of the Council on Foreign Relations (1977–1985), Ambassador to China (1985–1989), and Assistant Secretary of State (1993–1997).

Early life and education
Lord was born in New York City, New York on August 14, 1937.

Lord is the third of three sons born to Oswald Bates Lord (1903–1986) and Mary Pillsbury Lord (of the flour family, Pillsbury) (1904–1978). His older brother, Richard, died in 1935, aged three months. The oldest brother is Charles Pillsbury Lord. His father was a leader in the textile industry. His mother served for eight years under President Eisenhower as United States Delegate to the United Nations and U.S. Representative to the United Nations Commission on Human Rights and she was the recipient of many awards including International Rescue Committee's Freedom Award. Mary Pillsbury Lord was a survivor of the sinking of the Clyde-Mallory Line's passenger liner SS Mohawk off the New Jersey Coast in January 1935.

After attending The Buckley School and the Hotchkiss School, Lord graduated magna cum laude from Yale College in 1959 and obtained an M.A. at the Fletcher School of Law and Diplomacy of Tufts University in 1960. He has honorary doctorate degrees from several institutions, including Williams College, Tufts University, Bryant College, and Pepperdine University. He is a member of the Yale secret society Skull and Bones.

Career 
Lord played a role in the restoration of relations between the United States and China in the early 1970s, and he has been a key figure in US-China relations ever since. From 1969–73, as a member of the United States National Security Council's planning staff, he was the special assistant to National Security Advisor Henry Kissinger, accompanying him on his secret trip to Beijing in 1971. The following year, he was part of the U.S. delegation during President Richard Nixon's historic visit to China, was on President Ford's visit in 1975 and many other Kissinger trips. Lord was in every Nixon, Ford, and Kissinger meeting with Mao Zedong, Zhou Enlai, and Deng Xiaoping during the 1970s.

Lord was also the top assistant on Vietnam negotiations, in every Kissinger meeting with North Vietnam from 1970–1973. Lord was a principal drafter of both the 1972 Shanghai Communiqué, which opened relations with China, and the 1973 Paris Peace Accords, which ended the Vietnam War.

Lord became the State Department's Director of Policy Planning and top policy adviser on China (1973–77), United States Ambassador to China (1985–1989) under President Reagan, and Assistant Secretary of State for East Asian and Pacific Affairs (1993–1997) under President Clinton. Early in his career he served in the Foreign Service and the Defense Department. He was a senior counselor for the President's National Bi-partisan Commission on Central America (1983–1984).

Between governmental posts Ambassador Lord has headed and helped direct many private organizations related to international affairs. He served as President of the Council on Foreign Relations (1977–1985). He was co-Chairman of the International Rescue Committee Board and Overseers, Chairman of the National Endowment for Democracy, and Chairman of the Carnegie Endowment National Commission on America and the New World (1992). He is currently a director of the U.S. Committee for Human Rights in North Korea. , a global advisor to the Women's Tennis Association, Chair Emeritus of the International Rescue Committee, trustee of the Trilateral Commission, Vice Chair of the NCAFP Northeast Asia Security Forum, and member of the Council on Foreign Relations. He is a former member of the Steering Committee of the Bilderberg Group.

Lord has also previously served on the Boards or as a member of the America-China Forum, The Fletcher School, National Committee on US-China Relations, US-Japan Foundation, American Academy of Diplomacy, Asia Society, and Aspen Institute Distinguished Fellows.

Lord has written articles in The New York Times, Washington Post, Wall Street Journal, Newsweek, Time, and Foreign Affairs. In 2019, he is expected to publish Kissinger on Kissinger: Reflections on Diplomacy, Grand Strategy, and Leadership, a book of interviews that Lord conducted with the former National Security Advisor.

Personal life 
Lord has been married since 1963 to author and human rights activist Bette Bao Lord and has two children, Elizabeth Pillsbury and Winston Bao.

References

External links
Interview with Winston Lord as part of Frontline Diplomacy: The Foreign Affairs Oral History Collection of the Association for Diplomatic Studies and Training, a site at the Library of Congress. Complete oral history at ADST.org

Presidents of the Council on Foreign Relations 
1937 births
Living people
Directors of Policy Planning
Hotchkiss School alumni
Yale College alumni
Nixon administration personnel
Ford administration personnel
Clinton administration personnel
Ambassadors of the United States to China
United States National Security Council staffers
The Fletcher School at Tufts University alumni
Members of the Steering Committee of the Bilderberg Group
United States Foreign Service personnel